Clistoronia is a genus of northern caddisflies in the family Limnephilidae. There are about five described species in Clistoronia.

Species
These five species belong to the genus Clistoronia:
 Clistoronia flavicollis (Banks, 1900)
 Clistoronia formosa (Banks, 1900)
 Clistoronia graniculata (Denning, 1966)
 Clistoronia maculata (Banks, 1904)
 Clistoronia magnifica (Banks, 1899)

References

Further reading

 
 
 

Trichoptera genera
Articles created by Qbugbot
Integripalpia